Ghosts is the fourth studio album by Canadian rock  band Big Wreck. The album was announced on April 8, 2014, with the title track "Ghosts" being released as the album's lead single the same day. The album was nominated for "Rock Album of the Year" at the 2015 Juno Awards.

Commercial performance
The album debuted at #5 on the Canadian Albums Chart, selling 4,000 copies in its first week. The album also debuted at #4 on the Billboard Heatseekers chart, which is the band's highest position on that chart in their history.

Track listing

Personnel
Big Wreck
 Ian Thornley – vocals, lead guitar, keyboards
 Brian Doherty – rhythm guitar
 Paulo Neta – lead & rhythm guitar, backing vocals
 David McMillan – bass guitar
 Chuck Keeping – drums, percussion

References

2014 albums
Big Wreck albums